Bob and Mike Bryan were the defending champions, but lost in the second round to Jamie Murray and John Peers.
Alexander Peya and Bruno Soares won the title, defeating Murray and Peers in the final, 4–6, 7–6(7–4), [10–4].

Seeds
All seeds received byes into the second round.

Draw

Finals

Top half

Bottom half

External links
 Main draw

Aegon Championships - Doubles
2014 Aegon Championships